The 2010 Polish local elections were held in two parts, with its first round on 21 November and the second on 5 December. The first round included elections of deputies to provincial voivodeship sejmiks, as well for gmina and powiat councilors. The second round of elections were marked for mayors, borough leaders, and other positions decided by runoff elections. The local elections were seen as a test to the ruling Civic Platform and Polish People's Party coalition government under Prime Minister Donald Tusk.

Background
As the first polls since the July presidential elections, which saw Civic Platform candidate Bronisław Komorowski defeat Law and Justice MP and former Prime Minister Jarosław Kaczyński, the 2010 local elections were characterized as a test to the administration of Donald Tusk. In the weeks prior to the elections, polls conducted by the CBOS Institute showed the ruling Civic Platform party with a comfortable lead over its rivals. The opposition Law and Justice electoral campaign faced multiple challenges prior to the elections. Polls published in the days leading up to the first round indicated low support for the party.  In a related addition, a severe internal party crisis regarding Kaczyński's leadership and the party's ideological direction, simmering among several of the party's more moderate MPs in the Sejm for several months prior, exploded into the open days before the election. The rebel MPs, led by expelled party member Joanna Kluzik-Rostkowska, formed the Poland Comes First parliamentary group on 16 November. The party split further undermined confidence to the government's opposition.

Due to mandates in Polish law, all electioneering, poll surveys, and campaigning ceased on 20 November, in the period known as the "election silence."

Results

Analysis
Following the tabulated results of the election's first round, Civic Platform emerged with a victory, increasing its profile across provincial, county, and municipal councils. In voivodeship sejmiks, Civic Platform won control of 12 voivodeships, and tied for first place in another. The party's national junior coalition partner, the Polish People's Party, won outright in Świętokrzyskie Voivodeship. Law and Justice received a majority in two voivodeships. Following the results, Prime Minister Tusk and Deputy Prime Minister Waldemar Pawlak agreed to extend their coalition into local administrations. Civic Platform performed well in county powiat councils, and also significantly raised its electoral profile in municipal gmina councils.

The Polish People's Party also emerged as a winner following the elections, capturing a strong 16 percent of the vote, exceeding previous expectations from pre-election polling. In powiat councils, the party particularly increased its share thanks to its strong connections to local politics. In gmina elections, the party expanded gains from the previous 2006 local elections.

Law and Justice suffered defeats in all voivodeship, powiat and gmina council tiers of government. While the defeat did not signify a total collapse  as survey polls previously suggested, the results pointed towards a general trend of decline for the rightist party, with critics pointing to the perceived aloofness of its party leader, Jarosław Kaczyński.

The center-left Democratic Left Alliance also benefited during the elections. Although pushed to fourth place by the surprising gains of the Polish People's Party, the Democratic Left Alliance increased their numbers in provincial voivodeship sejmiks and powiat councils, though the party suffered losses in gmina council elections.

While Civic Platform achieved considerable success in the outright reelection of Hanna Gronkiewicz-Waltz as Mayor of Warsaw without a second round, the electorate continued to lean for nonpartisan independent mayors. Independent candidates led in over half of the country's 18 largest cities against mainstream party candidates. Civic Platform's attempts to unseat independent mayors in Kraków, Katowice, Poznań, Toruń and Wrocław all ended in defeat.

In the county and municipal levels, independent candidates and local political committees captured the most votes, retaining 38 percent of all county councilor seats and over 71 percent of all municipal councilor seats.

Turnout
The turnout in the first round was 47.32%, and in the second round - 35.31%.

Voivodeship councils

County councils

Municipal councils

References

National Electoral Commission

2010
Local elections
History of Poland (1989–present)
November 2010 events in Europe
December 2010 events in Europe